The Wilderness may refer to wilderness, a natural environment.

The Wilderness may also refer to:

Places
The Wilderness Forest, in Virginia
The Wilderness (preserve), and The Wilderness Trail, part of the Edge of Appalachia Preserve in southern Ohio
The Wilderness (Trappe, Maryland), a historic home at Matthews in Maryland
The Wilderness (Catonsville, Maryland), a historic home near Catonsville in Maryland
 The Wilderness SSSI, Isle of Wight, a site of special scientific interest on the Isle of Wight
 The Battle of the Wilderness, in 1864 in north-central Virginia, during the American Civil War

Novels
 The Wilderness (novel), an historical novel by James McHenry 
 The Wilderness, a novel by Samantha Harvey
 "The Wilderness" (short story), by Ray Bradbury (1952)

Music
 The Wilderness (Cowboy Junkies album), 2012
 The Wilderness (Explosions in the Sky album), 2016

The Wilderness Society
 The Wilderness Society (Australia), an Australian not-for-profit non-governmental organisation that fights environmental issues
 The Wilderness Society (United States), a not-for-profit organization in the United States that advocates for the protection of U.S. public lands

Other uses
 The Wilderness, a nickname of Willesden Junction station, London

See also
Wilderness (disambiguation)
The Wilderness Society (disambiguation)